Dean Matthew Kent (born 6 November 1978 in Palmerston North, New Zealand) is a 3-time Olympic swimmer from New Zealand. He represented New Zealand at the 2000, 2004, and 2008 Olympics.

At the 2004 Olympics, he set the New Zealand Records in the 200 and 400 IMs. As of June 2010, he still holds both these records; with times swum at the 2006 Commonwealth Games (400 IM—4:18.20) and the 2007 World Championships (200 IM—2:00.30).

Kent now works as Head of Swimming at Northern Arena Learn to Swim and Fitness Facility, Silverdale Auckland New Zealand.

Kent's younger brother Steven represented New Zealand in swimming at the 2012 Summer Olympics.

Personal best time
200 I.M. (LCM): 2:00.30
400 I.M. (LCM): 4:18.55

References

External links
 
 
 
 

1978 births
Living people
Sportspeople from Palmerston North
Olympic swimmers of New Zealand
Swimmers at the 2008 Summer Olympics
Swimmers at the 2004 Summer Olympics
Swimmers at the 2000 Summer Olympics
Commonwealth Games silver medallists for New Zealand
Swimmers at the 2002 Commonwealth Games
Swimmers at the 2006 Commonwealth Games
New Zealand male medley swimmers
Commonwealth Games medallists in swimming
Goodwill Games medalists in swimming
Competitors at the 2001 Goodwill Games
Medallists at the 2006 Commonwealth Games